The 1857 Massachusetts gubernatorial election was held on November 3. Incumbent Know-Nothing Governor Henry J. Gardner ran for a fourth term in office, but lost the support of the Republican Party, which nominated Speaker of the United States House of Representatives Nathaniel P. Banks. Banks prevailed over Gardner to become the first Republican Governor of Massachusetts.

Gardner's loss also began an informal tradition of no Governor serving more than three consecutive one-year terms, which persisted until 1920, when the Governor's term was extended to two years. The only exception to this tradition was made for Governor John Albion Andrew, who held office during the Civil War.

General election

Candidates
 Nathaniel Prentiss Banks, Speaker of the U.S. House of Representatives (Republican)
 Erasmus Beach, nominee for Governor in 1855 and 1856 (Democratic)
 Henry J. Gardner, incumbent Governor (American)
 Caleb Swan ("Straight Republican")

Results

See also
 1857 Massachusetts legislature

References

Governor
1857
Massachusetts
November 1857 events